The Glasair Sportsman 2+2 is a single-engine, high wing, strut-braced, four seat kit aircraft, developed by the Glasair Aviation company.

Design and development
The Sportsman 2+2 was developed from the company's Glastar aircraft, a smaller version. The company's "Two Weeks to Taxi" program provides factory-assisted assembly, while providing the owner with training in using tools and jigs. This complies with the Federal Aviation Administration's 51% construction rule, allowing issuance of a Special Certificate of Airworthiness as an amateur-built aircraft.

The aircraft can be fitted with tricycle landing gear or conventional landing gear and can also be equipped with floats and amphibious floats or tundra tires. The completed aircraft can be switched between any of the three landing gear configurations. 

The aircraft is constructed with a fiberglass fuselage, or optionally from carbon fiber, with all metal wings and horizontal stabilizer and elevator. The airplane is available with a Lycoming IO-360 engine or a  Lycoming IO-390 engine with an optional constant speed propeller. or with a 155 hp (114 kW) Continental CD-155 diesel engine that is certified to run on either diesel or jet fuel.

Variants
Glasair Sportsman 2+2 Diesel
A Thielert Centurion 2.0s powered variant.

Carbon Sportsman
A variant with the fuselage constructed of carbon fiber rather than fiberglass. The weight savings of carbon fiber are negated by heavier duty cage, wing struts, and wing skins; both variants have the same empty weight, but the carbon variant gross weight is increased by 150 lb.

Specifications (Sportsman 2+2)

References

External links

Kitplanes Review: Sportsman in Transition

Homebuilt aircraft
Single-engined tractor aircraft
Sportsman
High-wing aircraft